Gilberto Pereira dos Santos, usually known as Gilberto Pereira (born 9 May 1965 in Mirandópolis), is a Brazilian football coach and former player who played as a defender.

Honours

Player
 Ituano
 Campeonato Paulista Série A2: 1989

Nova Andradina
 Campeonato Sul-Mato-Grossense: 1992

Al-Riyadh
 Saudi Professional League: 1993-94
 Saudi Crown Prince Cup: 1993-94

Remo
 Campeonato Paraense: 1997

Manager
 Iraty
 Copa Tribuna U-20: 2003, 2004
 Campeonato Paranaense U-20: 2005

References

1965 births
Living people
Brazilian footballers
Brazilian football managers
Campeonato Brasileiro Série A players
Saudi Professional League players
Expatriate footballers in Saudi Arabia
Brazilian expatriate footballers
Brazilian expatriate sportspeople in Saudi Arabia
Expatriate football managers in Costa Rica
Campeonato Brasileiro Série B players
Campeonato Brasileiro Série A managers
Campeonato Brasileiro Série B managers
Coritiba Foot Ball Club players
Ituano FC players
Clube Náutico Capibaribe players
Al-Riyadh SC players
Clube do Remo players
União Recreativa dos Trabalhadores players
Coritiba Foot Ball Club managers
Iraty Sport Club managers
Londrina Esporte Clube managers
Puntarenas F.C. managers
Goiânia Esporte Clube managers
Associação Chapecoense de Futebol managers
Associação Desportiva Confiança managers
Atlético Clube Goianiense managers
Operário Ferroviário Esporte Clube managers
Associação Atlética Anapolina managers
Association football defenders
Associação Olímpica de Itabaiana managers
Nacional Futebol Clube managers
Vitória Futebol Clube (ES) managers
People from Mirandópolis